Georgiyevka is the name of several rural localities in Russia:
Georgiyevka, Loktevsky District, Altai Krai, a selo in Georgiyevsky Selsoviet of Loktevsky District of Altai Krai
Georgiyevka, Rebrikhinsky District, Altai Krai, a selo in Georgiyevsky Selsoviet of Rebrikhinsky District of Altai Krai
Georgiyevka, Tabunsky District, Altai Krai, a selo in Belozersky Selsoviet of Tabunsky District of Altai Krai
Georgiyevka, Amur Oblast, a selo in Korolinsky Rural Settlement of Oktyabrsky District of Amur Oblast
Georgiyevka, Bakalinsky District, Republic of Bashkortostan, a village in Starosharashlinsky Selsoviet of Bakalinsky District of the Republic of Bashkortostan
Georgiyevka, Karmaskalinsky District, Republic of Bashkortostan, a village in Yefremkinsky Selsoviet of Karmaskalinsky District of the Republic of Bashkortostan
Georgiyevka, Irkutsk Oblast, a village in Tayshetsky District of Irkutsk Oblast
Georgiyevka, Kemerovo Oblast, a village in Stupishinskaya Rural Territory of Tyazhinsky District of Kemerovo Oblast
Georgiyevka, Khabarovsk Krai, a selo in imeni Lazo District of Khabarovsk Krai
Georgiyevka, Bogotolsky District, Krasnoyarsk Krai, a village in Yuryevsky Selsoviet of Bogotolsky District of Krasnoyarsk Krai
Georgiyevka, Kansky District, Krasnoyarsk Krai, a selo in Georgiyevsky Selsoviet of Kansky District of Krasnoyarsk Krai
Georgiyevka, Bereznegovatsky Selsoviet, Dobrinsky District, Lipetsk Oblast, a village in Bereznegovatsky Selsoviet of Dobrinsky District of Lipetsk Oblast
Georgiyevka, Pavlovsky Selsoviet, Dobrinsky District, Lipetsk Oblast, a village in Pavlovsky Selsoviet of Dobrinsky District of Lipetsk Oblast
Georgiyevka, Chistoozyorny District, Novosibirsk Oblast, a village in Chistoozyorny District, Novosibirsk Oblast
Georgiyevka, Vengerovsky District, Novosibirsk Oblast, a village in Vengerovsky District, Novosibirsk Oblast
Georgiyevka, Gorkovsky District, Omsk Oblast, a selo in Georgiyevsky Rural Okrug of Gorkovsky District of Omsk Oblast
Georgiyevka, Kormilovsky District, Omsk Oblast, a selo in Georgiyevsky Rural Okrug of Kormilovsky District of Omsk Oblast
Georgiyevka, Poltavsky District, Omsk Oblast, a selo in Olginsky Rural Okrug of Poltavsky District of Omsk Oblast
Georgiyevka, Tyukalinsky District, Omsk Oblast, a village in Beloglazovsky Rural Okrug of Tyukalinsky District of Omsk Oblast
Georgiyevka, Alexandrovsky District, Orenburg Oblast, a selo in Georgiyevsky Selsoviet of Alexandrovsky District of Orenburg Oblast
Georgiyevka, Ponomaryovsky District, Orenburg Oblast, a settlement in Klyuchevsky Selsoviet of Ponomaryovsky District of Orenburg Oblast
Georgiyevka, Samara Oblast, a selo in Kinelsky District of Samara Oblast
Georgiyevka, Saratov Oblast, a selo in Marksovsky District of Saratov Oblast
Georgiyevka, Tomsk Oblast, a village in Tomsky District of Tomsk Oblast
Georgiyevka, Tula Oblast, a village in Kurakovsky Rural Okrug of Belyovsky District of Tula Oblast
Georgiyevka, Voronezh Oblast, a selo in Rostashevskoye Rural Settlement of Paninsky District of Voronezh Oblast
Georgiyevka, Zabaykalsky Krai, a selo in Nerchinsko-Zavodsky District of Zabaykalsky Krai